Following is a list of animated feature films featuring lesbian, gay, bisexual, transgender, and otherwise LGBT characters. For each animated film, the year of release, title, characters, identities, and country of origin are given. Any applicable franchise associated with the film is also noted. For each animated film, notes are given to indicate the nature of the featured LGBT characters.

There are also separate lists of LGBT-related films, films with LGBT themes organized by year and animated series with LGBT characters.

Film franchises

Stand-alone films

Short films

See also

 List of graphic art works with LGBT characters
 List of LGBT-related films
 List of yaoi anime and manga
 List of yuri works
 List of LGBT characters in television and radio
 Lists of American television episodes with LGBT themes
 List of television series with bisexual characters

Notes

References

Citations

Sources
 

 
Animated
Animated Films